Lithuanian Family Movement (Lithuanian: Lietuvos šeimų sąjūdis, LŠS) is a right-wing traditionalist anti-gender movement in Lithuania. The primary focus of the union is voicing out their opposition for bills it mostly considers to be unconstitutional or a threat to the traditional nuclear family, the well-being of children, and society at large, such as the legalization of same-sex civil unions, same-sex marriages, decriminalisation of drugs, ratification of Istanbul Convention or vaccine passports. The Lithuanian Family Movement was founded on June 27, 2021, as a response to the Homeland Union, a liberal conservative party that received the majority of votes in the 2020 parliamentary election and formed a coalition with the liberal Freedom Party, began promoting LGBT policies. Some people involved in the movement have been accused by government officials of having taken violent action during civil protests. However, the protest's key organisers have rejected such claims, stating they were staged provocations.

Movement structure and ideology 
The Lithuanian Family Movement is a unified sociopolitical entity with Raimondas Grinevičius alongside the Council of other nine members serving as its primary leadership. The movement organises a march, known as the Great Family Defense March, annually. According to one of the founders Arturas Orlauskas, the purpose of such nationwide gatherings is “to protect the Lithuanian state from anticonstitutional actions, which violate the basic rights and freedoms of the society.” They are also organized to “defend our country’s children, the youth, families, and schools from the harmful influence of sexual minorities…”

Relations with foreign partners 
The movement has been strengthening its ties with other European anti-gender groups and government officials in countries such as Poland, Hungary, Italy, Germany, and Ireland. On September 1, 2021, the former Hungarian Minister of Family Affairs, Katalin Novák, congratulated and expressed her support to the Lithuanian Family Movement in an official written address to the Chairman of the Council and the Lithuanian people. Soon after, Irish senator Rónán Mullen congratulated the movement for fighting for “a society where every person is being respected and is striving for common good.” On September 9, 2021, the Polish Minister of Family, Labour and Social Policy, Marlena Maląg, showed her support to the movement as well. In 2022, Florio Scifo, the World Youth Alliance coordinator of Italy, sympathised with the movement participants of the annual march. On June 13–14, 2022, a delegation from the Lithuanian Family Movement held a meeting with the management of the Polish Catholic organisation Ordo Iuris and officially agreed on further cooperation.

References 

2021 establishments in Lithuania
LGBT rights in Lithuania
LGBT rights in Europe
Organizations established in 2021
Organizations that oppose LGBT rights